The 1975 Virginia Slims of Sarasota  was a women's tennis tournament played on indoor carpet courts at the Robarts Sports Arena in Sarasota, Florida in the United States that was part of the 1975 Virginia Slims World Championship Series. It was the third edition of the tournament and was held from January 13 through January 19, 1975. Second-seeded Billie Jean King won the singles title and earned $15,000 first-prize money.

Finals

Singles
 Billie Jean King defeated  Chris Evert  6–2, 6–3
 It was King's 1st singles title of the year and the 113th of her career.

Doubles
 Chris Evert /  Billie Jean King defeated  Betty Stöve /  Virginia Wade 6–2, 7–5

Prize money

References

Virginia Slims of Sarasota
Virginia Slims of Sarasota
Virginia Slims of Sarasota
Virginia Slims of Sarasota